Pyrenees Highway is a rural highway in western Victoria, Australia, linking Glenelg Highway in Glenthompson to Calder Highway in Elphinstone. It intersects with the region's major road freight route, Western Highway in Ararat, in addition to Midland Highway in Castlemaine and Sunraysia Highway in Avoca. It was named after the Pyrenees ranges the highway runs through. This name covers many consecutive roads which are not widely known to most drivers except for the easternmost section, as the entire allocation is best known by the name of its last constituent part: Maroona–Glenthompson Road, Mortlake–Ararat Road and Pyrenees Highway proper. This article will deal with the entire length of the corridor for sake of completion, as well to avoid confusion between declarations.

In 1855, the Victorian Parliament passed the Chinese Immigration Act 1855, severely limiting the number of Chinese passengers permitted on an arriving vessel. To evade the new law, ship's captains landed many Chinese in the south-east of South Australia, from where the new arrivals travelled more than 400 km across country to the Victorian goldfields, along tracks including what is now the Pyrenees Highway.

History
Construction of a replacement Glenmona Bridge as a wrought-iron lattice-girder deck-truss bridge over Bet Bet Creek at Bung Bong was completed in 1871, and still stands, minus the deck, today; it replaced a timber structure from 1857 which was washed away by severe floods in 1870. It is the third-oldest of its type in Victoria, is listed on the Victorian Heritage Register, and stands just to the south of the modern-day bridge used today by the highway.

The passing of the Highways and Vehicles Act of 1924 through the Parliament of Victoria provided for the declaration of State Highways, roads two-thirds financed by the State government through the Country Roads Board (later VicRoads). The Pyrenees Highway was declared a State Highway in August 1938, cobbled together from roads between the Calder Highway at Castlemaine, via  Maryborough and Avoca to Ararat (for a total of 92.5 miles); before this declaration, these roads were referred to as Castlemaine-Maryborough Road, Maryborough-Avoca Road and Avoca-Ararat Road. With the deviation of the Calder Highway past Castlemaine declared in the 1959/60 financial year, the previous alignment of the Calder Highway between Castlemaine and Elphinstone was also added to the Pyrenees Highway. Its western end was later extended from Ararat to Glenthompson in the 2000s.

Pyrenees Highway was signed as State Route 122 between Ararat and Elphinstone in 1986; with Victoria's conversion to the newer alphanumeric system in the late 1990s, this was replaced by route B180, extended to Glenthompson at the same time the highway was extended.

The passing of the Road Management Act 2004 granted the responsibility of overall management and development of Victoria's major arterial roads to VicRoads: in 2004, VicRoads re-declared the road as Maroona-Glenthompson Road (Arterial #5109) from Glenelg Highway in Glenthompson to Maroona, as Mortlake-Ararat Road (Arterial #5100) between Maroona and Ararat, and in 2011 as Pyrenees Highway (Arterial #6740) between Western Highway in Ararat and Calder Freeway at Elphinstone; while the road south of Ararat is signed solely as B180, it is still usually referred to as part of the Pyrenees Highway.

See also

 Australian gold rushes
 Highways in Australia
 Highways in Victoria

References

External links

  Avoca and District Historical Society
  Prior website of the Avoca and District Historical Society

Highways in Australia
Transport in Barwon South West (region)